Florian Wanner (born 2 February 1978, in Wolfratshausen, Upper Bavaria) is a German judoka.

Achievements

References

External links
 
 

1978 births
Living people
People from Wolfratshausen
Sportspeople from Upper Bavaria
German male judoka
Judoka at the 2000 Summer Olympics
Judoka at the 2004 Summer Olympics
Olympic judoka of Germany
World judo champions
21st-century German people
20th-century German people